Badrallach ( or Am Bad Tràilleach) is a village on the north shore of Little Loch Broom in Wester Ross, in the Highland council area of Scotland. It is located at the end of a minor road from Dundonnell, and has a holiday cottage, campsite and bunkhouse. A footpath continues from Badrallach to the remote community of Scoraig.

References

Populated places in Ross and Cromarty